Elmer Julius Boeseke, Jr. (August 5, 1895 – October 17, 1963) was an American polo player who competed in the 1924 Summer Olympics. He was born in Santa Barbara, California. In 1924 he won the silver medal with the American team in the Olympic polo tournament.

He also won the Argentine Open Polo Championship in 1932 with Michael Phipps, Winston Guest, and William Post. It was the only time that an American team (or non-Argentina team) has ever won the Argentine Open Polo Championship.

References

External links
profile

1895 births
1963 deaths
Sportspeople from Santa Barbara, California
American polo players
Olympic polo players of the United States
Polo players at the 1924 Summer Olympics
Olympic silver medalists for the United States
Olympic medalists in polo
Medalists at the 1924 Summer Olympics